Samsung Galaxy C8 is an  Android smartphone developed by Samsung Electronics. It was launched September 2017. The phone has 32GB (expandable up to 256GB) of internal storage, 3GB of  RAM, and a 1.69 GHz octa-core CPU.

Specifications

Hardware
The Samsung Galaxy C8 has 32GB (expandable up to 256GB) of internal storage and 3GB of  RAM. A  microSD card can be inserted for up to an additional 256GB of storage. The rear facing dual cameras have a resolution of 13+5 MP, while the front facing camera is 16 MP. The phone has a 1.69 GHz octa-core CPU and is also equipped with a fingerprint scanner.

History
Samsung Galaxy C8 smartphone was launched in September 2017.

See also 
 Samsung
 Samsung Electronics
 Samsung Galaxy
 Samsung Galaxy C7
  Android

References

Samsung Galaxy
Mobile phones introduced in 2015
Android (operating system) devices
Samsung mobile phones
Discontinued smartphones